Walter Youell (27 December 1909 – 23 January 1994) was a South African rower. He competed in the men's single sculls event at the 1936 Summer Olympics.

References

1909 births
1994 deaths
South African male rowers
Olympic rowers of South Africa
Rowers at the 1936 Summer Olympics
People from Vereeniging
Sportspeople from Gauteng
20th-century South African people